John Fletcher Hurst (August 17, 1834 – May 4, 1903) was an American bishop in the Methodist Episcopal Church and the first Chancellor of the American University in Washington, D.C.

Biography

Born on August 17, 1834, in Salem, Dorchester County, Maryland. Hurst graduated from Dickinson College in 1854 and in 1856 went to Germany to study at the University of Halle and the University of Heidelberg.

From 1858 to 1866 he was engaged in pastoral work in America. He was ordained by Methodist Episcopal Bishop Thomas Asbury Morris in 1862. From 1866 to 1870 he filled a five-year appointment as Professor of Systematic Theology at the Martin Mission Institute in Bremen, Germany.  In 1870, Hurst was chosen to teach Historical Theology at Drew Theological Seminary in Madison, New Jersey, where he was elected President in 1873, serving until elected to the episcopacy in 1880.

In his book « History of the Christian Church », Bishop Hurst states that the early Christians “would have looked with horror” at the suggestion of having images in places of worship. Today, christians, would follow the pattern set by the first-century Christians : Do not pray to images of “saints” or angels; do not even pray to Jesus. And do not perform acts of worship to symbols of the State. Come what may, we are determined to obey Jesus’ words: “It is The Lord your God you must worship.”​—Matt. 4:10. 

Through his devotion, Hurst recovered the endowment of Drew Theological Seminary, lost by the failure in 1876 of Daniel Drew, its founder; and with John McClintock and George Richard Crooks he improved the quality of Methodist scholarship.

As bishop he was assigned to Des Moines, Iowa.  He subsequently served as the first chancellor of the American University (Methodist Episcopal) in Washington, D.C., where through his work finances were secured and the university opened.  He served as chancellor from 1891 until his death on May 4, 1903, in Bethesda, Maryland.

Legacy
On the campus of American University, there is an academic building named after Hurst.

Works
A History of Rationalism (1866)
Hagenbach's Church History of the Eighteenth and Nineteenth Centuries (2 vols., 1869), a translation
van Oosterzee's John's Gospel: Apologetical Lectures (1869), a translation
Lange's Commentary on the Epistle to the Romans (1869), a translation with additions
Martyrs to the Tract Cause: A Contribution to the History of the Reformation (1872), a translation and revision of Thelemann's Märtyrer der Traktatsache (1864)
Outlines of Bible History (1873)
Outlines of Church History (1874)
Life and Literature in the Fatherland: the Story of a Five Years' Residence in Germany (1875), sketches of Germany
Our Theological Century (1877), a brief pamphlet
Bibliotheca Theologica (1883), a compilation by his students, revised by G. W. Gillmore in 1895 under the title Literature of Theology
 The outgrowth of his travels in 1884-1885 when he held the conferences of India
A Short History of the Christian Church (1893), several church histories (Chautauqua text-books) published together

See also
List of bishops of the United Methodist Church

References

External links 
 
 
 
 

1834 births
1903 deaths
Bishops of the Methodist Episcopal Church
Leaders of American University
American historians of religion
American Methodist Episcopal bishops
American expatriates in Germany
American pamphleteers
American male non-fiction writers
American evangelicals
Translators from German
Translators from Dutch
American theologians
Methodist theologians
Systematic theologians
People from Dorchester County, Maryland
Dickinson College alumni
University of Halle alumni
Heidelberg University alumni
19th-century translators
Drew University faculty
Presidents of Drew University
19th-century American clergy
Historians from Maryland